Sorigny is a French commune in the Indre-et-Loire department, Centre-Val de Loire.

Sorigny has been twinned with the village of Box, in Wiltshire, Great Britain, since 2016.

History
It is a parish that was confirmed in March 1031 by a charter of Robert II of France. It was formerly divided into two fiefs.

Hydrography
The municipal hydrographic network, with a total length of 31.09 km, includes two notable rivers, the Bourdin (3.075 km) and the Montison (2.731 km), and ten small rivers that flow at certain times.

The Bourdin, with a total length of 14.8 km, rises in the commune of Louans and flows into the Indre at Veigné after crossing five communes.

Transport
Transport in Sorigny is managed by the Centre-Val de Loire region and trains are operated by Transdev Touraine on the Rémi rail network. There are links between Tours and Sorigny via lines G, H, H1 and H2.

Economy
In 2018, the commune planned to establish a "brand village" on 20 hectares of its territory, near the A10 autoroute. Sorigny belongs to the Touraine Indre Valley community of towns (Communauté de communes Touraine Vallée de l'Indre).

Population

Notable residents
 Marcel Gaumont (1880–1962), a sculptor, was born there.

Town twinning
 Box, Wiltshire, Great Britain

Notable buildings and monuments
Église romane Saint-Pierre-ès-Liens (Saint-Pierre-ès-Liens Church), built in the 11th century and rebuilt in 1866 by Étienne Guérin Charles Gustavus.
Château de Longue Plaine (Longue-Plaine Castle), built in the 19th century except for two towers that are from the 15th and 16th centuries.
Le Monument aux Morts (The War Memorial) of 1914–1918, made by the sculptor Marcel Gaumont and the architect Maurice Boille.
Aérodrome de Tours (Aerodrome of Tours) in Sorigny.

Gallery

See also
Communes of the Indre-et-Loire department
Marcel Gaumont Sculptor of war memorial

References

Communes of Indre-et-Loire